This is a list of members of the Northern Territory Legislative Council from 13 December 1947 to 10 December 1949.

The council consisted of 14 members. Six members were elected to four single-member electorates (Alice Springs, Batchelor, Stuart and Tennant Creek), and one two-member electorate (Darwin). Seven members (called Official Members) were appointed by the Australian government, all of whom were department heads in the public service of the Northern Territory. The Administrator of the Northern Territory, Arthur Driver, served as presiding officer (or president) of the council.

 Chief Medical Officer Dr John McGlashan was transferred to the role of Quarantine Officer in Perth, Western Australia in January 1949. His place on the council was filled by acting CMO Dr William Kirkland, until Dr Edward Gunson was officially appointed as McGlashan's replacement in February.
 On 18 August 1949, the Governor-General appointed Les Dodd (Director of Education) and John Huthnance (Chief Clerk) to the vacancies caused by the resignation of appointed members Leonard Lucas and Edward Gunson. On the same day, Darwin businessman Eric Izod was appointed to replace elected member Frank Hopkins.
 The member for Batchelor, William Fulton, resigned on 23 August 1949. The vacancy was not filled until the next election in December.

See also
1947 Northern Territory general election

References

Members of Northern Territory parliaments by term
Members of the Northern Territory Legislative Council